Macroglossum moecki is a moth of the  family Sphingidae.

References

Macroglossum
Moths described in 1969